Neoceratitis is a genus of tephritid  or fruit flies in the family Tephritidae.

Species
The genus includes the following species.

 Neoceratitis asiatica
 Neoceratitis chirinda
 Neoceratitis cyanescens
 Neoceratitis efflatouni

References

Dacinae
Tephritidae genera